Lac Genin is a lake in the Ain department, France. Its surface area is 8.15 ha at an elevation of 850 m. The lake is fed by underground sources.

Genin